Tomáš Berdych defeated Ivan Ljubičić in the final, 6–3, 6–4, 3–6, 4–6, 6–4 to win the singles tennis title at the 2005 Paris Masters.

Marat Safin was the reigning champion, but did not compete.

Seeds
A champion seed is indicated in bold text while text in italics indicates the round in which that seed was eliminated.  All sixteen seeds received a bye into the second round.

Draw

Finals

Top half

Section 1

Section 2

Bottom half

Section 3

Section 4

References 
 2005 BNP Paribas Masters Draw
 2005 BNP Paribas Masters Qualifying Draw

Singles